Kisaragi (如月) is the second month of the Japanese calendar.

Kisaragi may also refer to:

Fictional characters
 Kisaragi Saemon, a character in the novel The Kouga Ninja Scrolls
 Kisaragi Yamaguchi, the main character of the manga series GA Geijutsuka Art Design Class
 Chihaya Kisaragi, a character in the video game series The Idolmaster
 Eiji Kisaragi, a character in the video game series Art of Fighting
 Gentaro Kisaragi, the main character of the tokusatsu television series Kamen Rider Fourze
 Haruna Kisaragi, a character in the anime television series Corrector Yui
 Hisui Kisaragi, a character in the anime television series Tokyo Majin
 Honey Kisaragi, the main character of the manga series Cutie Honey
 Jin Kisaragi, a character in the video game series BlazBlue
 Mao Kisaragi, a character in the anime television series Psycho-Pass
 Nanao Kisaragi, a character in the light novel series Tsurune
 Quon Kisaragi, a character in the anime television series RahXephon
 Saya Kisaragi, the main character of the anime television series Blood-C
 Takumi Kisaragi, a character in the anime television series Gad Guard
 Tsubasa Kisaragi, a character in the video game series Aikatsu Stars!
 Yuffie Kisaragi, a character in the video game series Final Fantasy

Other uses
 Kisaragi (film), a 2007 Japanese film
 Japanese destroyer Kisaragi (1905), a destroyer launched in 1905 and scrapped in 1928
 Japanese destroyer Kisaragi (1925), a destroyer launched in 1925 and sunk in 1941
 Kisaragi Sho, a Japanese horse race
 Kisaragi Station, a Japanese urban legend

Japanese-language surnames